Victor Joukovski is a Paralympian athlete from Belarus competing mainly in category P10 pentathlon events.

He competed in the 1996 Summer Paralympics in Atlanta, Georgia, United States.  There he won a bronze medal in the men's Pentathlon - P10 event, a bronze medal in the men's Triple jump - F10 event and finished fourth in the men's Long jump - F10 event

External links
 

Year of birth missing (living people)
Living people
Paralympic athletes of Belarus
Athletes (track and field) at the 1996 Summer Paralympics
Paralympic bronze medalists for Belarus
Medalists at the 1996 Summer Paralympics
Paralympic medalists in athletics (track and field)
Belarusian male long jumpers
Belarusian male triple jumpers
Visually impaired long jumpers
Visually impaired triple jumpers
Paralympic long jumpers
Paralympic triple jumpers
Belarusian people with disabilities
Blind people